Afroedura africana, also known as African rock gecko, is a species of African gecko found in Namibia and South Africa.

References

africana
Reptiles of Namibia
Reptiles of South Africa
Taxa named by George Albert Boulenger
Reptiles described in 1888